The Cold Synagogue was a masonry synagogue located in the center of Minsk on what is now  Niamiha Street. It was not used as a place of study and therefore was not heated, which is why it received the name "Cold". The synagogue is considered the oldest in Minsk.

History 

The building was erected in 1570, though it is assumed that it housed an Orthodox church, and only in 1796 the building was bought by the Jewish community, rebuilt and renovated. However, in architectural terms, this structure was originally characteristic of synagogues of that era. 

In 1930, the synagogue was closed.

In 1944, after the liberation of Minsk from the German occupation, the synagogue was again handed over to believing Jews for a short time.

In 1965, the synagogue was demolished during the reconstruction of this district of Minsk.

Gallery

See also 
 Cold Synagogue, Mogilev

References

External links 

 About the synagogue and the neighbouring district, with photos (in Belarusian)

Synagogues in Belarus
16th-century synagogues
Buildings and structures in Minsk